Goethe Plaque of the City of Frankfurt is an award conferred by Frankfurt, Hesse, Germany and named after Johann Wolfgang von Goethe. The plaque was originally designed by sculptor Harold Winter. The plaque is awarded at irregular intervals to important poets, writers, artists, scientists and other personalities of the cultural life.

Recipients

1947 
1947 
1947 Franz Volhard
1948 
1949 André Gide
1949 Adolf Grimme
1949 Gerhard Marcks
1949 José Ortega y Gasset
1949 Carl Jacob Burckhardt
1949 Friedrich Meinecke
1949 Robert M. Hutchins
1949 Victor Gollancz
1951 
1951 
1951 Alexander Rudolf Hohlfeld
1951 Boris Rajewsky
1951 Ernst Robert Curtius
1951 Friedrich Dessauer
1951 
1951 L.A. Willoughby
1952 
1952 John J. McCloy
1952 Ludwig Seitz
1953 Max Horkheimer
1953 Fritz Strich
1954 August de Bary
1954 Karl Kleist
1954 Richard Scheibe
1954 Rudolf Alexander Schröder
1955 
1955 Fritz von Unruh
1955 Ferdinand Blum
1955 
1955 Paul Hindemith
1956 Peter Suhrkamp
1956 
1956 
1956 Paul Tillich
1957 
1957 Gottfried Bermann Fischer
1957 
1957 Kasimir Edschmid
1957 Helmut Walcha
1958 
1958 
1958 Helmut Coing
1958 
1958 Martin Buber
1959 Veronica Wedgwood
1959 Jean Schlumberger
1959 
1959 Sir Sarvepalli Radhakrishnan
1959 Thornton Wilder
1959 Yasunari Kawabata
1960 
1960 
1960 Franz Böhm
1961 
1962 Edgar Salin
1963 
1963 
1963 Theodor W. Adorno
1964 Harry Buckwitz
1965 Carl Orff
1966 Heinrich Troeger
1966 Marie Luise Kaschnitz
1966 
1967 Carl Tesch
1967 Werner Bockelmann
1967 Wilhelm Schöndube
1967 
1973 Kurt Hessenberg
1974 
1974 
1976 Albert Richard Mohr
1977 
1977 Oswald von Nell-Breuning SJ
1978 
1979 Christoph von Dohnanyi
1979 Erich Fromm
1979 
1980 Rudolf Hirsch
1980 
1980 Horst Krüger
1980 Fuat Sezgin
1981 Wilhelm Kempf
1981 Sir Georg Solti
1982 Leo Löwenthal
1982 
1983 
1984 Marcel Reich-Ranicki
1986 Alfred Grosser
1987 Joachim C. Fest
1988 
1989 Dorothea Loehr
1989 Alfred Schmidt
1989 Dolf Sternberger
1990 
1990 Hilmar Hoffmann
1991 Albert Mangelsdorff
1992 Iring Fetscher
1993 Willi Ziegler
1994 
1994 Ludwig von Friedeburg
1994 
1995 Emil Mangelsdorff
1995 
1995 
1996 Christiane Nüsslein-Volhard
1996 Walter Boehlich
1997 
1997 Hans-Dieter Resch
1998 
1998 
1998 
1999 Arno Lustiger
1999 
2000 Karl Dedecius
2000 Michael Gotthelf
2001 Ernst Klee
2001 
2002 Horst-Eberhard Richter
2002 
2002 Heiner Goebbels
2002 Oswald Mathias Ungers
2003 
2003 Christa von Schnitzler
2003 
2003 Albert Speer
2003 Jean-Christophe Ammann
2004 
2004 
2005 Henriette Kramer
2005 
2006 Eliahu Inbal
2006 Peter Iden
2007 
2007 Thomas Bayrle
2008 E. R. Nele
2008 
2009 Peter Kurzeck
2009 Rosemarie Fendel
2010 
2011 
2011 
2012 
2012 Mischka Popp and Thomas Bergmann
2013 
2013 
2014 
2014 
2014 Wilhelm Genazino
2015 Martin Mosebach
2015 Sven Väth
2016 Bettina von Bethmann
2016 Tobias Rehberger
2017 Moses Pelham
2017 
2018 
2019 Bodo Kirchhoff
2019 
2019 Max Hollein
2020 Silke Scheuermann
2020 Burkard Schliessmann
2021 Hans Zimmer
2021 Sandra Mann

References

External links
Official Website
Goethe-Plakette der Stadt Frankfurt am Main

Awards established in 1932
German awards
Johann Wolfgang von Goethe
1932 establishments in Germany
Culture in Frankfurt